Casalino is a comune (municipality) in the Province of Novara in the Italian region Piedmont, located about  northeast of Turin and about  southwest of Novara.

Casalino borders the following municipalities: Biandrate, Borgo Vercelli, Casalbeltrame, Casalvolone, Confienza, Granozzo con Monticello, Novara, San Pietro Mosezzo, and Vinzaglio.

Curiosity 
In the municipality of Casalino, in the Cameriano area and nearby, the movie Rice Girl (Italian title La risaia) by Raffaello Matarazzo was shot. (Info by the Dizionario del Turismo Cinematografico)

Demographic evolution

References

Cities and towns in Piedmont